For information on all Lamar University sports, see Lamar Cardinals and Lady Cardinals

The 2015 Lamar Cardinals baseball team represents Lamar University in the 2015 NCAA Division I baseball season.  The Cardinals play their home games at Vincent–Beck Stadium and are members of the Southland Conference.  The team is coached by Jim Gilligan in his 39th season at Lamar.

Previous season
In 2014, the Cardinals  finished the season 8th in the Southland with a record of 31–25, 16–14 in conference play. They qualified for the 2014 Southland Conference baseball tournament and were eliminated in the first round. They failed to qualify for the 2014 NCAA Division I baseball tournament.

Roster

Coaches

Preseason
The Cardinals were predicted to finish 8th in the Southland in the preseason Coaches and Sports Information Director polls.

On February 5, three Cardinals were named to Southland Conference All-Conference teams.  Brandon Provost, playing catcher for the Cardinals, was named as a 1st Team All-Conference member, and Reed Seeley, as third baseman, and Kyle Markhum, as designated hitter, were named as 2nd Team All-Conference members.

Season

February
Head coach Jim Gilligan achieved his 1,300th career win in the February 13 season opener pitting the Cardinals against the New Mexico State Aggies.  He joined five other active college coaches with 1,300 or more career wins.

March
The Cardinals opened March play with a non-conference loss to Texas–Pan American in Edinburg, Texas.  The month closed with the Cardinals losing another non-conference game against the Rice Owls.  The Cardinals began conference play in March with series against Northwestern State, Central Arkansas, and New Orleans building a conference record of 3–6.  The Cardinals also played two other conference foes during the month, Nicholls State and Abilene Christian, but those games were scheduled as non–conference games.  The team had a 7–11 overall record during the month of March with a 13–15 for the season to date.

April
The Cardinals opened April play with a conference win against Texas A&M–Corpus Christi at home.  The month closed with a home loss to Texas Southern.  The Cardinals split all four of the conference series only winning the series against Texas A&M–Corpus Christi.  At the end of April, the team finished with a 5–7 conference record for the month and an 8–13 season to date conference record.  In non-conference play, the Cardinals recorded one victory against Grambling State and had losses to LSU, Baylor, and Texas Southern.  The team had a 6–10 overall record during the month of April with a 19–25 for the season to date.

May
The Cardinals opened May play with a five-game losing streak.  The team ended the month with a record of 2–6 and were eliminated as a possible contender in postseason play on May 9.  The team ended the season with a 21–31 overall record and a 10–19 record in conference play.  The Cardinals ended the season in 12th place in Southland Conference play.

Schedule

Note:  Nicholls State and Abilene Christian series games were scheduled as non-conference games.

References

Lamar Cardinals baseball seasons
Lamar
Lamar Cardinals baseball team